This list of permanent representatives of Germany to NATO includes all permanent representatives of the Federal Republic of Germany to NATO since 1955.

References

 
NATO
Germany Permanent Representatives
Germany